Flint Fleming (born March 17, 1965) is a former American football player who played twelve seasons in the Arena Football League with the Detroit Drive, Massachusetts Marauders, Orlando Predators, Tampa Bay Storm, Arizona Rattlers, Milwaukee Mustangs, Buffalo Destroyers and Florida Bobcats. He played college football at North Dakota State University. He was also a member of the Atlanta Falcons and Calgary Stampeders. Fleming played in six ArenaBowls, winning three.

References

External links
Just Sports Stats

Living people
1965 births
Players of American football from Wisconsin
American football offensive linemen
American football defensive linemen
Canadian football defensive linemen
American players of Canadian football
North Dakota State Bison football players
Calgary Stampeders players
Detroit Drive players
Massachusetts Marauders players
Orlando Predators players
Tampa Bay Storm players
Arizona Rattlers players
Milwaukee Mustangs (1994–2001) players
Buffalo Destroyers players
Florida Bobcats players
Sportspeople from Madison, Wisconsin